Simon Charles Francis (born 16 February 1985) is an English assistant first-team technical director at AFC Bournemouth and former professional footballer who played as a defender. 

He notably played in the Premier League for AFC Bournemouth who were the final team he played for, he spent eight years with the club with five coming in the top flight. He had previously played for Bradford City, Sheffield United, Southend United and Charlton Athletic, as well as spending loan spells with Grimsby Town and  Tranmere Rovers He earned International caps for both England U18 and England U20.

Playing career
Born in Nottingham and whilst playing for local side West Bridgford Colts Francis was rejected as a youngster by both of the city clubs: Notts County and Nottingham Forest. Instead he joined Bradford City as a trainee in 2002 after being spotted playing for South Nottingham College. He made his debut for Bradford on 16 November 2002 against Nottingham Forest days after he came on as a substitute for England under 18s against France. He made more than 50 starts for the Bantams, scoring his first career goal in a game against Crystal Palace, before being sold for £200,000 by the administrators in 2004. Bradford received offers from Sunderland and Sheffield United, with Francis choosing the latter to be nearer his home in Nottingham and link up with manager Neil Warnock.

Competition for places meant that Francis was never quite able to hold down a regular place at Bramall Lane, restricting him to just 15 appearances for the Blades during his two-year sojourn. He spent most of the 2005–06 season on loan with Grimsby Town and then Tranmere Rovers (where he scored once against Swansea City). His final appearance for Sheffield United was as a late substitute at Luton in the penultimate game of the season.

On 13 June 2006, Francis transferred to newly Promoted [[EFL Championship side Southend United for an undisclosed fee, signing a three-year contract.

In June 2008, he was initially transfer listed by Southend United after failing to agree a new contract, but two weeks later he signed for another two years with Southend.

In January 2010, Southend  accepted an offer for Francis from Peterborough United but he failed to agree personal terms. Following Southend's relegation in to League Two, Francis stated that he had no desire to leave the relegated club. Three weeks later, Southend accepted a £150,000 offer for Francis from Brentford.

On 8 July 2010, new Southend manager Paul Sturrock agreed to cancel the defender's contract, allowing him to find a new club as a free agent. On 30 July, Francis signed for Charlton Athletic.

On 7 November 2011, Francis signed on loan to AFC Bournemouth and the deal was made permanent in January 2012.
Francis was instrumental in Bournemouth's promotion to The Football League Championship in 2012–2013 and won Players' Player of the Season.
In Bournemouth's first season in the second tier of English football since 1990, Francis played all but 45-minutes of the season.
In the summer of 2014, Francis signed a further contract for three-years at Bournemouth.

On 26 December 2018, Francis suffered a ruptured anterior cruciate ligament of his right knee in a Premier League 0–5 loss to the Tottenham Hotpsur.

On 23 November 2019, Francis was given a red card after pulling Diogo Jota to the ground, only 16 minutes after his yellow card, in the Premier League 1–2 loss against Wolverhampton .

Post-playing career
Having since retired from professional football, Francis took over a local academy from ex-Bournemouth captain Harry Arter now named Simon Francis Academy.

On 30 June 2021, Francis re-joined AFC Bournemouth in an assistant first-team technical director capacity, supporting Richard Hughes and the recruitment team in identifying and securing transfer targets.

Career statistics

Honours
AFC Bournemouth
Football League Championship: 2014–15

Individual
PFA Team of the Year: 2012–13 League One, 2014–15 Championship

References

External links

Profile at 11v11

1985 births
Living people
Footballers from Nottingham
English footballers
Association football defenders
Bradford City A.F.C. players
Sheffield United F.C. players
Grimsby Town F.C. players
Tranmere Rovers F.C. players
Southend United F.C. players
Charlton Athletic F.C. players
AFC Bournemouth players
English Football League players
Premier League players
People educated at West Bridgford School
People from West Bridgford
Footballers from Nottinghamshire